Dror-Israel is a pioneering educational movement whose mission is to effect meaningful, long-term educational and social change in Israeli society in order to promote solidarity, social activism, democracy and equality. Dror-Israel aims to form the grassroots nucleus of an exemplary society in Israel based on the vision of the prophets of Israel and the founders of Zionism.

Dror Israel emphasizes participation from every sector of Israeli society, including Ethiopian and Russian immigrants, Arab Israelis, Druze and Bedouins, and middle class and working class communities. In the past decade, Dror Israel has established 16 educators' kibbutzim in the social and geographic periphery of Israel. There are currently 1,200 young adults living in these kibbutzim, aged 20–40, who work daily in the organization's educational, cultural and social activities with over 100,000 children, teens and adults.

History
Dror Israel was founded in 2006 by graduates of HaNoar HaOved VeHaLomed (Working and Studying Youth) youth movement. HaNoar HaOved VeHaLomed was founded in 1924 by youth working to defend their rights. HaNoar HaOved VeHaLomed founded more than one hundred kibbutzim between 1930 and 1980. In the 1990s, along with the decline of the kibbutz movement, HaNoar HaOved VeHalomed began re-examining the ideal life path of its members,
which had encouraged settling kibbutzim in Gar'inim (core groups) after finishing their mandatory period of army service. In place of this path, a model started to be put forward in which graduates of the movement formed small urban communes working in society, particularly in education. As part of this process of change, Dror Israel was founded to give a name to this new movement, and today includes HaNoar HaOved VeHaLomed as its daughter youth movement. As of 2014, there are about 1,200 members of Dror Israel, graduates of HaNoar HaOved VeHaLomed living in small communes in cities or kibbutzim and working in Israeli society – mostly in education and the youth movement. Dror-Israel is named after the historical "Dror" Zionist youth movement.

Vision and Mission 

Dror Israel's Vision for Israel is a society of democracy, equality, and peace created through education and community, where all share responsibility, benefit from opportunity, and realize their own potential, based on the founding principles of Zionism.

Dror Israel's Mission is to educate and empower young people and those on the social and geographic periphery to actively contribute to their communities and to create a shared society in Israel.

Educators' kibbutzim

Dror Israel's 16 educators' kibbutzim throughout Israel are made up of 1,200 active young people who live together in communities and commit to bettering Israeli society, working in various social, educational and community projects. The educators' kibbutzim strive for a new way of life that enables the members to actualize the Jewish values of Zionism, equality and social responsibility in the reality of Israel's geographic and socio-economic periphery.
 30–100 educators live in each kibbutz in accordance with local needs and the preferences of group members
 Each educators' kibbutz is responsible for a wide variety of activities specific to the needs of the local community
 The educators' kibbutzim are located throughout Israel – urban and rural areas, the center and the periphery
 Some 100 young members of Dror Israel join the educator's kibbutzim each year

Objectives and activities
Dror Israel believes that Jewish values are the foundation of a humanist, Zionist, democratic and egalitarian worldview. These values manifest themselves in all of the movement's programs for youth and adults, as well as in the members' own culture and lifestyle.

Work with youth at-risk behavior

Dror Israel educates and assists children and youth in disadvantaged communities throughout Israel, most of whom live in Israel's social periphery and are exposed to poverty, inequality, drug use, neglect, violence, and discrimination. Dror Israel strives to provide them with a better future through innovative pedagogical programs that teach them life skills, professional training and educational tools in our various schools and programs:
 Dror educational centers – a network of seven high schools and two boarding schools
 Seven after-school centers for at-risk youth in disadvantaged neighborhoods
 Professional consultation and assistance for working youth on employment issues
 Pre-military academy (Mehina) for at-risk youth, focusing on leadership and entrepreneurial skills

Hanoar Haoved Vehalomed
Hanoar Haoved Vehalomed (The General Federation of Students and Young Workers in Israel) movement centers throughout Israel run a broad variety of educational activities, including seminars, continuing education, and camps and excursions, alongside local daily activities – all emphasizing involvement in Israeli society. The members value community activity and leave their home branches to become leaders at branches and centers in disadvantaged communities. Youth movement alumni have gone on to become social, political, military and cultural leaders in Israel, including former prime minister, Yitzhak Rabin, and former president and prime minister, Shimon Peres.
After their army service, many youth movement graduates choose to join Dror Israel educators' kibbutzim.

Jewish–Arab co-existence

Dror Israel operates unique educational initiatives for encounters between Jews and Arabs – with dozens of educators and thousands of children and youth participating each year.
Dror Israel co-existence activities throughout Israel:
 HaNoar HaOved VeHaLomed youth movement – informal educational activities for thousands of young people and educators in Arab villages and towns
 Leadership and empowerment workshops – encounters for Jewish and Arab youth, leadership groups, women's groups and seminars in Arab schools
 Language as a cultural bridge – English lessons by volunteers from abroad, Hebrew lessons for Arab communities, and Arabic lessons for Jewish communities
 Educators' gatherings – for Jewish and Arab educators and unique pedagogical workshops on current events, racism and co-existence
 Sherut Leumi (National service) – young Arab-Israelis aged 18–19 dedicate one or two years of service to their communities in various projects

External links

 Dror Israel Official Website
 Official Dror Israel facebook page
 The Educators' Kibbutzim of the "Dror Israel"

References

Cooperatives in Israel
Labor Zionism
Zionist youth movements
Youth organizations based in Israel
2006 establishments in Israel
Educational organizations based in Israel